Adrian Rainey (born 6 January 1979) is a former professional rugby league footballer who played for the Western Suburbs, Parramatta Eels and the Bulldogs in the National Rugby League (NRL), plus Castleford Tigers (Heritage No. 790) in the Super League.

Playing career
Rainey, who played his junior football at Eagle Vale, started his NRL career with Western Suburbs. A forward, Rainey made 13 first-grade appearances in his debut season in 1998 and earned the club's "rookie of the year" award. However, in the off-season he tested positive to the anabolic steroid stanozolol and received a two-year ban.

Returning from his ban in 2001, Rainey resumed his NRL career with Parramatta, where he played mostly in the reserves, with only two-first grade appearances. In 2002, Rainey had a stint in England playing for the Castleford Tigers, then from 2003 to 2004 played for Canterbury. Rainey's only first-grade game for Canterbury came in the club's 2004 premiership winning season.

Rainey was the second player, after John Berne, born in Northern Ireland to play first grade rugby league in Australia.

References

External links
Adrian Rainey at Rugby League project

1979 births
Living people
Canterbury-Bankstown Bulldogs players
Castleford Tigers players
Doping cases in Australian rugby league
Irish rugby league players
Parramatta Eels players
Rugby league players from County Antrim
Rugby league props
Rugby league second-rows
Western Suburbs Magpies players